Ryan O'Shaughnessy is the first EP by Irish singer-songwriter Ryan O'Shaughnessy released on 13 August 2012 in the United Kingdom. The EP peaked at number 1 on the Irish Albums Chart. The album includes the single "No Name".

Singles
"No Name" was released as the lead single from the EP on 5 August 2012. The single peaked at number 3 on the Irish Singles Chart.

Critical reception
Digital Spy gave the EP a positive review stating, "Listening to his self-titled EP – a taster of what will follow on his debut album – it's easy to see why. Much like his contemporary, O'Shaughnessy is a fresh-faced singer-songwriter-guitar-player with a heavy heart. But while Sheeran regularly delves into the nastiness of drugs, miscarriages and booze, he remains in the tight, well-worn confines of love and relationships. Lead track 'No Name' – about an unrequited crush – remains as fresh and genuine as it did during its first outing earlier this year, while 'First Kiss' carries the same boy-next-door innocence without feeling overly contrived. 'Lost In You' and 'Sofa Bed' swerve dangerously close to borderline obsessive, but given they were written pre-BGT, something tell us he'll have a very different perspective come the full album."

Track listing

Chart performance

Release history

References

2012 debut EPs
Ryan O'Shaughnessy albums